EUCMOS is the abbreviation of the conference series "European Congress on Molecular Spectroscopy".

Scope 
The European Congress on Molecular Spectroscopy (EUCMOS) is held every two years. The first Congress in this series was held in Basel (Switzerland) in 1951. It focuses on all aspects of spectroscopic methods and techniques (including applications), as well as computational and theoretical approaches for the investigation of structure, dynamics, and properties of molecular systems.

This Congress covers various scientific topics including vibrational, electronic and rotational spectroscopies, spectroscopy of surfaces and interfaces, spectroscopy of biological molecules, computational methods in spectroscopy, applied spectroscopies (archaeology, geology, mineralogy, arts, environmental analysis, food analysis, and processing), new materials, and  time-resolved spectroscopy.

History 
The European Molecular Spectroscopy Group, which was constituted informally after the Second World War to bring together spectroscopists from across Europe, met for the first time in Konstanz in 1947. Reinhard Mecke was at the time working in temporary accommodation at Wallhausen, a small village on the shores of Lake Constance, and the meeting (initiated by invitation of Professors Jean Lecomte and Alfred Kastler from Paris) was attended by French, German and Austrian spectroscopists.

However, the meeting which has since become regarded as the first of the EUCMOS series was organised under the auspices of Ernst Miescher in Basel in 1951, followed every two years by conferences in Paris (1953), Oxford (1955), Freiburg (1957), Bologna (1959), Amsterdam (1961), Budapest (1963), Copenhagen (1965), Madrid (1967) and Liége (1969). The next meeting was not held until 1973 when it was organized in Tallinn. The 1975 meeting in Strasbourg was devoted to the molecular spectroscopy of dense phases. The biennial meetings were perturbed for the second time in 1991 when EUCMOS XX, which was due to be held in Zagreb, had to be cancelled because of the Civil war in Yugoslavia. The following meeting, in Vienna, was brought forward by a year and the meetings have since been held in the even years. At EUCMOS XXII held in Essen (1994), William James Orville-Thomas retired as President of the International Committee and Austin Barnes was elected to this post. During his mandate, 11 conferences of the series were held, included the one organized in Coimbra in the Year 2000 (EUCMOS XXV). In EUCMOS XXXIII (2016, Szeged) Barnes retired as President of the International Committee and Rui Fausto (vice-President since EUCMOS XXVII, in Cracow, together with Henryk Ratajczak) was elected to this position. The new President had already been chosen as the organizer of the following EUCMOS meeting in Coimbra, 2018 (EUCMOS XXXIV). Sylvia Turrel and Michael Schmitt are the current vice-Presidents of the International Committee.

EUCMOS gathered over the years (present and future) Nobel prize winners from all areas of molecular physics as plenary speakers. This starts in 1953 with Alfred Kastler in Paris (Nobel prize 1966) followed by Gerhard Herzberg 1989 in Leipzig (Nobel prize 1971), Harold Kroto 2000 in Coimbra (Nobel prize 1996) and Theodor W. Hänsch 2010 in Florence (Nobel prize 2005).

Overview 

* Not held because of the civil war in Yugoslavia.

References

attribution contains material licensed under CC-BY-3.0 from http://www.qui.uc.pt/eucmos2018/EUCMOS_history.html  © 2016 EUCMOS 2018

International conferences
Spectroscopy